Jack Stokes may refer to:

 Jack Stokes (politician) (1923–2000), Canadian politician
 Jack Stokes (director) (1920–2013), animation director

See also 
 John Stokes (disambiguation)